Vandazhi-II is a village in the Palakkad district, state of Kerala, India. It is administered by Vandazhy gram panchayat, along with Mangalam Dam and Vandazhi-I.

Demographics
 India census, Vandazhi-II had a population of 11,776 with 5,740 males and 6,036 females.

References

Villages in Palakkad district